Schut is a Dutch occupational surname derived from schutter, meaning "archer". Notable people with the surname include:

 Alje Schut (born 1981), Dutch footballer
 Anoushka Schut-Welkzijn (born 1969), Dutch politician
 Ans Schut (born 1944), Dutch speed skater
 Cornelis Schut (1597–1655), Flemish Baroque painter
 Cornelis Schut III (c. 1629–1685), Flemish painter active in Spain
 Lisa Schut (born 1994), Dutch chess player
 Lukáš Schut (born 1985), Czech footballer
  (1920–2006), Dutch government minister
Bakker Schut
  (1903-1966), Dutch civil engineer who drew the Bakker-Schut Plan of annexation of German territory after World War ||
  (1941–2007), Dutch lawyer

See also
 Schutt, a surname of the same origin
 Schutte, a surname of the same origin
 Vladislav Shoot (born 1941), British-Russian composer (Wladislaw Schut in German transliteration)
 Yana Shut (born 1997), Belarusian snooker and pool player (Jana Schut in German transliteration)

Dutch-language surnames

de:Schut